Diederik Jacob van Tuyll van Serooskerken (6 April 1772 – 11 April 1826) was a Dutch nobleman who served as a major general in the Imperial Russian Army, and later as the third Russian ambassador to the United States.

Biography 
Tuyll van Serooskerken was born on 6 April 1772, in The Hague. He served in the Dutch army until November 1803. He later joined the Imperial Russian Army and fought in the Napoleonic Wars as a major general.

After the war, he served various diplomatic positions for Russia in the Kingdom of Naples and Holy See. On 19 April 1823, he was appointed by Czar Alexander I of Russia to be the Russian ambassador to the United States.  Tuyll was Russian ambassador at a time when Russia was asserting claims to Alaska and American Secretary of State John Quincy Adams was formulating what would come to be known as the Monroe Doctrine, portions of which were shown to Tuyll prior to their publication in an address to Congress.    He served until 1826, and died on 11 April that same year during a sea voyage from his Washington posting.

He was buried in Halifax, Nova Scotia, in St. Peter's Cemetery, in April 1826. His grave is unmarked and lies under a parking lot built on top of the cemetery.

References

Footnotes

Sources

External links 
 

1772 births
1826 deaths
Ambassadors of Russia to the United States
Dutch emigrants to the Russian Empire
Dutch nobility
Dutch people of the Napoleonic Wars
Diederik
People from Maarssen
Russian commanders of the Napoleonic Wars